Albert of Saxe-Wittenberg may refer to:
 Albert II, Duke of Saxe-Wittenberg (1250–1298), first duke of Saxe-Wittenberg after its definite division from the Duchy of Saxony in 1296
 Albert, Bishop of Passau (died 1342), son of Albert II, Duke of Saxe-Wittenberg 
 Albert, Count of Anhalt (died 1329), son of Rudolf I, Duke of Saxe-Wittenberg 
 Albert of Saxe-Wittenberg, Duke of Lüneburg (died 1385), competed with Brunswick in Lüneburg War of Succession 
 Albert III, Duke of Saxe-Wittenberg (1375–1422), last in the Ascanian line of Saxe-Wittenberg